Coimbatore Mappillai is a 1996 Indian Tamil-language romantic comedy film directed by C. Ranganathan. It stars Vijay and Sanghavi. The film's score and music was composed by Vidyasagar. It was released on 15 January 1996 coinciding Pongal release. The film ended as a hit at the box office as it released on Pongal Festival, marking Vijay's favourable success streak with his other film releases on Pongal day.

Plot 
Balu comes to Chennai from Coimbatore and stays with his friend Gopal, who claims he has a job. Actually, he is also unemployed. Both of them are tenants of a girl named Sumithra. First, Balu and Sumithra get into fights, but then their arguments and fights turn into love. Meanwhile, Sumithra's cousin Mahesh is also in love with her. One day, Balu witnesses a thief stealing a necklace, and when he tries to catch him, the thief inserts the necklace in Balu's pocket, and Balu is blamed for stealing it. Sumithra starts hating Balu. Taking advantage of this situation, Mahesh creates a rift between them by hiring goons to attack them, and he blames Balu for that too. Balu explains his sad story to her grandmother Paattiamma that he lost his mother during small age and could not endure the torture of his stepmother, so he escaped from home. Paatiamma believes him, but Mahesh takes revenge by setting up wires and making her paralyzed. In the hospital, Sumithra overhears Mahesh and his father wanting to kill her to steal their colony. Balu pays the medical bills and attempts to commit suicide, but Sumithra saves him. Mahesh, who tried to kill him, is killed in a stampede. The film ends with Balu and Sumithra living happily.

Cast

Soundtrack 
The soundtrack was composed by Vidyasagar. Popular Bollywood playback singer Sadhana Sargam recorded her first Tamil song for this film.

In popular culture 
The film villain background music suddenly went viral in 2018 due to the word "Shroovv". In one of the scenes where Vijay's character talks to his grandmother about Karan's character, and the latter's appearance is seen along with the background music "Shroovv", thus earned him the title "the Shroov star".

References

External links 
 

1996 films
Indian romantic comedy films
1990s Tamil-language films
Films scored by Vidyasagar
1996 romantic comedy films